The 2016–17 Sultan Qaboos Cup is the 44th edition of the Sultan Qaboos Cup, the premier knockout tournament for football teams in Oman.

The competition began on 14 October 2016 with the Qualification round. Saham Club are the defending champions, having won their second title in 2016.

Teams
This year the tournament had 38 teams.

 Ahli Sidab Club (Sidab)
 Al-Bashaer Club 
 Al-Hamra SC (Al-Hamra)
 Al-Ittifaq Club
 Al-Ittihad Club (Salalah)
 Al-Khabourah SC (Al-Khabourah)
 Al-Mudhaibi Club (Mudhaibi)
 Al-Musannah SC (Al-Musannah)
 Al-Nahda Club (Al-Buraimi)
 Al-Nasr S.C.S.C. (Salalah)
 Al-Oruba SC (Sur)
 Al-Rustaq SC (Rustaq)
 Al-Salam SC (Sohar)
 Al-Seeb Club (Al-Seeb)
 Al-Shabab Club (Seeb)
 Al-Suwaiq Club (Suwaiq
 Al-Wusta Club (Al-Wusta)
 Bahla Club (Bahla)
 Bidia SC (Bidiya)
 Bowsher Club (Bowsher)
 Dhofar S.C.S.C. (Salalah)
 Fanja SC (Fanja)
 Ja'lan SC (Jalan Bani Bu Ali)
 Majees SC (Majees)
 Mirbat SC (Mirbat)
 Muscat Club (Muscat)
 Nizwa Club (Nizwa)
 Oman Club (Muscat)
 Quriyat Club (Quriyat)
 Saham SC (Saham)
 Salalah SC (Salalah)
 Sohar SC (Sohar)
 Sur SC (Sur)
 Yanqul SC (Yanqul)

Qualification round
8 teams played against each other in the First Round of qualification. The losing teams of the 4 ties than played a tie each against each other over one leg. 3 ties were played over one leg. The first match was played between Al-Ittifaq Club and Quriyat Club on 14 October 2016. Al-Ittifaq Club, Majees SC, Al-Hamra SC, Ahli Sidab Club, Yanqul SC and Al-Wusta Club advanced to the Round of 32 after winning their respective ties.

Round 1

Round 2

Round of 32

Round of 16
The draw for the round of 16 was held on 21 November 2016. The first match was played between Al-Rustaq SC and Oman Club on 9 December 2016 at the Al-Buraimi Sports Complex, Al-Buraimi.

Quarter-finals
The first match was played between Al-Salam and Al-Suwaiq on 15 December 2016 at the Sohar Regional Sports Complex, Sohar. Al-Suwaiq, Saham, Dhofar and Oman advanced to the Semi-finals.

First leg

Second leg

Semi-finals
The first match was played between Oman and Al-Suwaiq on 16 March 2017 at Sultan Qaboos Sports Complex, Muscat. Al-Suwaiq and Dhofar advanced to the Finals.

First leg

Second leg

Finals
The Finals of the 2016–17 Sultan Qaboos Cup was played between Al-Suwaiq and Dhofar on 25 May 2017 at the Sultan Qaboos Sports Complex, Muscat. Al-Suwaiq won the title for the third time in their history.

See also
2016–17 Oman Professional League

References

External links
Oman Sultan Cup 2016-2017 - Goalzz.com

Sultan Qaboos Cup seasons
Cup
Oman